Croatia competed at the Youth Olympic Games for the first time in 2010, and has participated in every Games since then.

The National Olympic Committee for Croatia is the Croatian Olympic Committee, which was created in 1991 and recognized in 1993.

Croatian athletes have won 8 medals at Summer Youth Games, swimming being the most successful sport with two gold medals. Croatia has not yet won any medals at Winter Youth Games, best result being Samuel Kolega's 4th place at 2016 Games in alpine skiing, boys' slalom.

Medal tables

Medals by Summer Games

Medals by Winter Games

Medals by summer sport

List of medalists

Summer Games

Summer Games medalists as part of Mixed-NOCs Team 
Note: Medals awarded in mixed NOC's are not counted for the respective country in the overall medal table.

Winter Games medalists as part of Mixed-NOCs Team

Flag bearers

See also
Croatia at the Olympics
Croatia at the Paralympics

References

 
Sport in Croatia
Youth sport in Croatia